They're Calling, Open the Door  is a  Soviet feature film of 1965 directed by Alexander Mitta, the debut of the twelve-year-old Elena Proklova in the cinema.

Plot
A fifth-grade student, Tanya (Elena Proklova), is in love with the pioneer leader Petya (Sergey Nikonenko), who is teased by one of her classmates.  Tanya's father  is a geologist, and her mother left for a while to see her husband; Tanya lives alone under the supervision of a neighbor in a communal apartment. To please the pioneer leader, she takes part in the search for an interesting person, one of the first soviet pioneers.

Cast
 Elena Proklova as Tanya Nechaeva
 Rolan Bykov as Pavel Vasilievich Kolpakov
 Sergey Nikonenko as Petya Kryuchkov
 Vladimir Belokurov as  violinist   Korkin
 Viktor Kosykh as Genka
 Valentina Vladimirova as watchman in  theater
 Oleg Yefremov as Vasily Dresvyannikov
 Lyusyena Ovchinnikova as Tanya's mother
 Iya Savvina as Genka's mother
 Vladimir Balon as teacher of fencing
 Yekaterina Vasilyeva as physical education teacher
 Klara Rumyanova as Klara Mikhailovna
 Andrei Smirnov as tenant
 Pavel Lebeshev as  Petya Kryuchkov's neighbor

Awards
 Venice Film Festival:  Lion of San Marco — Grand Prize	(Alexander Mitta)
 Mosfilm Award:  Best Actress 	(Elena Proklova)

References

External links 

1965 films
1965 drama films
Soviet drama films
Films based on Russian novels
Films set in schools
Mosfilm films
Films directed by Alexander Mitta